Maria Simon may refer to:

Maria Simon (sociologist) (19182022), Austrian sociologist
María Simón (19222009), Argentine sculptor
Maria Simon (actress) (born 1976), German actress